KXKS (1190 AM) is a radio station currently broadcasting a conservative talk format. Licensed to Albuquerque, New Mexico, United States, the station is currently owned by Wild West Radio Corporation.

The station was briefly operated by Rock of Talk LLC owners of KIVA 1600 via Leased Management Agreement (LMA). The full-time sports outlet from Fox Sports Radio on KXKS allowed for KIVA to focus more on news. The local "Rock of Talk" program was featured on both stations in the afternoon. KXKS was also broadcast on K298BY 107.5 FM which is now rebroadcasting KANW HD2.

1190 AM is a United States and Mexican clear-channel frequency.

History
The station went on the air as KPAR around 1970. The callsign changed to KKJY on 1979-01-23. On 1979-11-19, the station changed its call sign to the current KXKS. KXKS broadcast Spanish-language programming for over 20 years. In 2004 then-owner Clear Channel Communications sold KXKS to Wilkins Radio and later that year the format was changed to Christian talk and teaching. In late 2014 Wilkins had purchased KKIM 1000 from American General Media. In early 2015 the Christian programming had moved over to KKIM. On April 1, 2015, KXKS had changed their format to sports talk. The station had agreed to cary Art Bell's Midnight In The Desert starting July 20, 2015, however the sports talk format was dropped just before the show was to debut. KXKS would briefly simulcast KKIM before switching to Spanish-language programming sometime in September 2015. On February 27, 2017, KXKS switched to Christian radio, branded as "New Life Today".

On July 27, 2020, KXKS changed their format from Christian radio to conservative talk, branded as "The Answer", with programming from Salem Media Group.

References

External links
FCC History Cards for KXKS 
KXKS website

XKS
Conservative talk radio
News and talk radio stations in the United States
Radio stations established in 1970
1970 establishments in New Mexico